The 1995 Tipperary Senior Hurling Championship was the 105th staging of the Tipperary Senior Hurling Championship since its establishment by the Tipperary County Board in 1887. The championship began on 16 September 1995 and ended on 15 October 1995.

Toomevara were the defending champions, however, they were defeated by Boherlahan-Dualla at the semi-final stage.

On 15 October 1995, Nenagh Éire Óg won the championship after a 2-25 to 2-08 defeat of Boherlahan-Dualla in the final at Semple Stadium. It remains their only championship title.

Qualification

Results

Quarter-finals

Semi-finals

Final

Championship statistics

Top scorers

Top scorers overall

Top scorers in a single game

Miscellaneous
 Nenagh Éire Óg won the championship for the first time.
 Boherlahan-Dualla qualify for the final for the first time since 1953.

References

External links
 The Nenagh Co-Op. County Senior Hurling Championship '95

Tipperary
Tipperary Senior Hurling Championship